Bakharevsky is a rural locality (a settlement) in Akhtubinsky Selsoviet, Krasnoyarsky District, Astrakhan Oblast, Russia. The population was 266 as of 2010. There are 2 streets.

Geography 
Bakharevsky is located 63 km northwest of Krasny Yar (the district's administrative centre) by road. Vishnyovy is the nearest rural locality.

References 

Rural localities in Krasnoyarsky District, Astrakhan Oblast